The 2000 World Interuniversity Games were the second edition of the Games (organised by IFIUS), and were held in Amsterdam, the Netherlands.

External links
 Homepage IFIUS

World Interuniversity Games
World Interuniversity Games
World Interuniversity Games
International sports competitions hosted by the Netherlands
Multi-sport events in the Netherlands
World Interuniversity Games, 2000
November 2000 sports events in Europe
2000s in Amsterdam